Annan is a Scottish surname and Akan surname. The use of Annan as a surname is most common in Great Britain, Ghana, and other former British colonies. The earliest reference of Annan used as a surname is found in the 13th century Ragman Rolls during which Scots pledged homage to nobles. It is likely that people originating from or living in Annan, Dumfries and Galloway adopted "Annan" as their surname. Notable people with the Annan surname include:

Abraham Annan (born 1988), Ghanaian footballer
Alyson Annan (born 1973), Australian field hockey player
Amanda Annan (born 1982), Ghanaian actress and model
Anthony Annan (born 1986), Ghanaian footballer
Archie Annan (1877–1949), Scottish footballer
Beulah Annan (1899–1928), American suspected murderer
Christian Annan (born 1978), Ghanaian-born Hong Kong footballer
Daniel Francis Annan (1928–2006), Ghanaian judge and politician
Dorothy Annan (1908–1983), English painter, potter and muralist 
Dunc Annan (1895–1981), American football player 
Ebenezer Annan (born 2002), Ghanaian footballer 
Gabriele Annan (1921–2013), British author, and literary and film critic
James Annan, British climatologist
James Craig Annan (1864–1946), Scottish photographer
John Annan Bryce (1841–1923), Scottish businessman and politician
Kodwo Sam Annan, Ghanaian politician; member of parliament in the first republic of Ghana
Kofi Annan (1938–2018), Secretary-General of the United Nations
Kojo Annan (born 1973), Ghanaian businessman and son of Kofi Annan
Noel Annan, Baron Annan (1916–2000), member of the House of Lords and British academic
Richard Annan (born 1968), English footballer
Thomas Annan (1829–1887), Scottish photographer, father of James Craig Annan

See also
List of Scottish Gaelic surnames
Annan, Dumfries and Galloway
Battle of Annan
Battle of Annan Moor
Annanhead Hill
River Annan
Annandale (disambiguation)
Annan Castle
RAF Annan
HMS Annan (K404)

Surnames of Ashanti origin